San Biagio dell'Anello was a titular church in Rome, dedicated to Saint Blaise.

Cardinal-priests
 Ippolito de' Rossi (1587-1591)
 Guido Pepoli (1595-1596)
 Fernando Niño de Guevara (1597-1599)
 Bonviso Bonvisi (1599-1603)
 Girolamo Pamphilj (1604-1610)
 Orazio Spínola (1616)
 Title suppressed in 1616

References

San Biagio dell'Anello